Alpha-2,8-sialyltransferase 8B is an enzyme that in humans is encoded by the ST8SIA2 gene.

Function 

The protein encoded by this gene is a type II membrane protein that is thought to catalyze the transfer of sialic acid from CMP-sialic acid to N-linked oligosaccharides and glycoproteins. The encoded protein may be found in the Golgi apparatus and may be involved in the production of polysialic acid, a modulator of the adhesive properties of neural cell adhesion molecule (NCAM1). This protein is a member of glycosyltransferase family 29.

References

Further reading